The Last Giant: Anthology is an album by jazz musician John Coltrane. This 2-CD set compiles recordings spanning the years 1946–1967, and was released by Rhino Records in 1993.

Track listing
All tracks by John Coltrane, except where noted.

Disc one
 "Hot House" (Dameron) – 2:00
 "Good Grove" (Taylor) – 4:15
 "We Love to Boogie" (Gillespie) –  2:50
 "Bittersweet" (Smith) – 3:25
 "Through for the Night" (Young) – 4:29
 "Trane's Blues" – 8:32
 "While My Lady Sleeps" (Kahn, Kaper) – 4:36
 "Trinkle, Tinkle" (Monk) – 6:37
 "Blue Train" – 10:40
 "Russian Lullaby" (Berlin) – 5:30
 "My Favorite Things" (Rodgers, Hammerstein) – 13:41

Disc two
 "Central Park West" – 4:12
 "Body and Soul" (Green, Eyton, Heyman, Sour) – 5:35
 "Equinox" – 8:33
 "Cousin Mary" – 5:45
 "Giant Steps" – 4:43
 "Naima" – 4:21
 "My Favorite Things" (live) – 25:12
 "Ogunde" (excerpt) – 1:30

References

Compilation albums published posthumously
John Coltrane compilation albums
1993 compilation albums
Rhino Entertainment compilation albums